Monkey beetles are scarab beetles, a group of several genera within the tribe Hopliini. The placement of this tribe within the family Scarabaeidae is uncertain between Melolonthinae and Rutelinae. Many species visit flowers for pollen and nectar, or browse on the petals. The beetles are important pollinators of Aizoaceae and Asteraceae in grazed and ungrazed areas, as well as many others. They tend to favor flowers of white, yellow, pink, orange, and blue pigments. They also tend to favor flowers of symmetrical, abstract patterns  Due to their pollination patterns, many plants were able to develop special features that attracted monkey beetles, such as the Iridaceae which now have bright colors and symmetrical, unique patterns.

References

Scarabaeidae